This is a list of Japanese football transfers in the winter transfer window 2009–10 by club.

J.League Division 1

Albirex Niigata

In:

Out:

Kashima Antlers

In:

Out:

Omiya Ardija

In:

Out:

Shonan Bellmare

In:

Out:

Cerezo Osaka

In:

Out:

Kawasaki Frontale

In:

Out:

Gamba Osaka

In:

Out:

Nagoya Grampus

In:

Out:

Júbilo Iwata

In:

Out:

Montedio Yamagata

In:

Out:

Sanfrecce Hiroshima

In:

Out:

Kyoto Sanga FC

In:

Out:

Shimizu S-Pulse

In:

Out:

FC Tokyo

In:

Out:

Urawa Red Diamonds

In:

Out:

Vegalta Sendai

In:

Out:

Vissel Kobe

In:

Out:

Yokohama F. Marinos

In:

Out:

J.League Division 2

Avispa Fukuoka

In:

Out:

Consadole Sapporo

In:

Out:

Ehime FC

In:

Out:

Fagiano Okayama

In:

Out:

FC Gifu

In:

Out:

Mito HollyHock

In:

Out:

JEF United Chiba

In:

Out:

Kataller Toyama

In:

Out:

Giravanz Kitakyushu

In:

Out:

Kashiwa Reysol

In:

Out:

Roasso Kumamoto

In:

Out:

Sagan Tosu

In:

Out:

Thespa Kusatsu

In:

Out:

Tochigi SC

In:

Out:

Oita Trinita

In:

Out:

Ventforet Kofu

In:

Out:

Tokyo Verdy

In:

Out:

Tokushima Vortis

In:

Out:

Yokohama FC

In:

Out:

See also
 J.League

References

J.League Division 1 References

J.League Division 2 References

External links
 Official website 

Transfers
Transfers
2009-10
Japan